John Murtha (1932–2010), was a long-serving member of the United States Congress. John Murtha may also refer to:

John Murtha Johnstown-Cambria County Airport, an airport named for the Congressman
John Garvan Murtha (born 1941), U.S. federal judge
John Murtha (Wisconsin politician) (born 1951), Wisconsin State Assembly (Dist. 29)